Silk Hope is a 1999 made-for-TV romantic-drama film that starred Farrah Fawcett, along with Brad Johnson, Ashley Crow, and Scott Bryce.

Plot
Frannie Vaughn (Fawcett) comes back home after being away a long time, only to find that her mother has died. She also finds out that her sister, Natalie (Crow) and her fiance, Jake (Bryce), are planning to sell the acres once owned by Frannie and Natalie's family. To buy the land back from her sister, Frannie gets a job and falls in love with a fellow worker, Rubin (Johnson). In the end, Frannie's dreams come true and Natalie comes to her senses and moves into the old family house with Frannie and Rubin.

Cast
Farrah Fawcett as Frannie Vaughn 
Ashley Crow as Natalie 
Brad Johnson as Rubin 
Scott Bryce as Jake 
Herb Mitchell as Claude Osteen 
Debra Mooney as Violet 
Mark Lindsay Chapman as Ted Bass 
Diane Delano as Linda 
Kym Whitley as Grace 
Jan Hoag as Pig Farmer

References

External links

1999 television films
1999 films
American romantic drama films
American television films
Films directed by Kevin Dowling
1990s American films